The China Railway use a single fare structure across the country. The ticket price is established by the rate-making distance (运价里程), which usually equals to the actual rail distance.

CRH trains 

The CRH trains' fare was introduced on April 18, 2007.

Seat 

There are three types of seats on CRH trains: deluxe, first, and second; The deluxe-class only found on CRH3C and CRH380 trains.

 200–250 km/h trains
 Second class: ¥0.2805/km × 1.1 × rate-making distance + Insurance
 First class: ¥0.2805/km × 1.1 × 1.2 × rate-making distance + Insurance
 Insurance (required): ¥0.05861/km × rate-making distance × 0.02

Some CRH trains run on conventional low-speed tracks have special discount. Some long distance train's second-class seat equals to a hard sleeper of the same distance when it is more expensive.

Sleeper 

There are two types of sleepers on CRH trains: normal sleeper or deluxe sleeper; The deluxe-class only found on CRH1E trains. Each type of sleeper has upper or lower options.

The fare of a sleeper CRH train follows the formula:
 Upper berth: ¥0.3366/km × 1.1 × 1.6 × rate-making distance + Insurance
 Lower berth: ¥0.3366/km × 1.1 × 1.8 × rate-making distance + Insurance
 Deluxe upper berth: ¥0.3366/km × 1.1 × 3.2 × rate-making distance + Insurance
 Deluxe lower berth: ¥0.3366/km × 1.1 × 3.6 × rate-making distance + Insurance
 Insurance (required): ¥0.05861/km × rate-making distance × 0.02

Some train has special discount, for example, the sleeper train between Beijing and Shanghai provides 25% discount to the price above. For example, the train D301 from Beijing to Shanghai (rate-making distance = 1463 km), the price is calculated as:
 Upper berth: round_to_¥5((¥0.3366/km × 1.1 × 1.6 × 1463 km + ¥0.05861/km × 1463 km × 0.02) × 0.75) = ¥655
 Lower berth: round_to_¥5((¥0.3366/km × 1.1 × 1.8 × 1463 km + ¥0.05861/km × 1463 km × 0.02) × 0.75) = ¥730

Conventional trains 

For conventional trains, the fare basis has changed several times in history. The last time it changed was on October 1, 1995, when it was changed to ¥0.05861 per kilometer. The fare vary by trains' speed, air-conditioning, and travel class (seat or sleeper).

A train ticket is composed by passenger ticket, speed-up ticket, air-conditioning ticket, sleeper ticket, insurance and others.

 Passenger ticket with insurance

There are two different of passenger tickets: hard and soft. A hard-seat or hard-sleeper ticket requires a hard passenger ticket, while a soft-seat, soft-sleeper or deluxe-soft-sleeper ticket requires a soft passenger ticket.

The fare of a hard passenger ticket equals to the fare basis (¥0.05861 per kilometer). The fare of a soft passenger ticket is double. And if the distance is shorter than 20 km, 20 km is charged.

Insurance of 2% of a hard seat fare, or ¥0.0011722/km, is required for every passenger. The final price of a passenger ticket with insurance is calculated as:

 Hard: round_to_¥1(¥0.05861/km × rate-making distance + ceil_to_¥0.1(¥0.05861/km × 2% × rate-making distance))
 Soft: round_to_¥1(¥0.11722/km × rate-making distance + ceil_to_¥0.1(¥0.05861/km × 2% × rate-making distance))

 Speed-up ticket

There are three classes by speed:
 Normal passenger (普客), trains numbered from 6001 to 8998
 No speed-up ticket is required for this class
 Normal fast (普快), trains numbered from 1001 to 5998
 Fare of speed-up ticket is 20% of fare basis (¥0.011722 per kilometer) for this class
 Fast (快速) / Express (特快), trains prefixed with letter K, T, or Z
 Fare of speed-up ticket is 40% of fare basis (¥0.023444 per kilometer) for this class

If the distance is shorter than 100 km, 100 km is charged. The price of a speed-up ticket is rounded to ¥1.

 Air-conditioning ticket

Fare of an air-conditioning ticket equals to 25% of fare basis, or ¥0.0146525 per kilometer.

If a train has an air-conditioning system, air-conditioning ticket is required. As of 2009, almost all trains have a "new-type" air-conditioning system, that the air-conditioning system is centralized powered by locomotive or special power generation (KD) car. The price of passenger with insurance, sleeper-up, air-conditioning and sleeper tickets of a train with "new-type" air-conditioning system is 50% higher than normal trains, or 80% higher if it is a deluxe sleeper.

The price of an air-conditioning ticket is rounded to ¥1.

 Sleeper ticket

 Soft upper berth: ¥0.1025675/km
 Soft lower berth: ¥0.1142895/km
 Deluxe soft upper berth: ¥0.123081/km
 Deluxe soft lower berth: ¥0.134803/km

Any sleeper ticket is charged an extra ¥10.00 than the above formulas. If the distance is shorter than 400 km, 400 km is charged. The price of a sleeper ticket is rounded to ¥1.

Rounded to ¥1.00.

 About rate-making distance

The rate-making distance is rounded up using the following rules:

 1 km – 200 km: ceil(distance ÷ 10) * 10 - 5
 201 km – 400 km: ceil(distance ÷ 20) * 20 - 10
 401 km – 700 km: ceil(distance ÷ 30) * 30 - 15
 701 km – 1100 km: ceil(distance ÷ 40) * 40 - 20
 1101 km – 1600 km: ceil(distance ÷ 50) * 50 - 25
 1601 km – 2200 km: ceil(distance ÷ 60) * 60 - 30
 2201 km – 2900 km: ceil(distance ÷ 70) * 70 - 35
 2901 km – 3700 km: ceil(distance ÷ 80) * 80 - 40
 3701 km – 4600 km: ceil(distance ÷ 90) * 90 - 45
 4601 km —: ceil(distance ÷ 100) * 100 - 50

For example, the rate-making distance between Beijing and Shanghai is 1463 km, the distance value 1475 km used to calculate the price.

 About long-distance discount

For above prices and trip longer or equals to 201 km, the following discount rule is applied:

 201st km – 500th km section: 90%
 501st km – 1000th km section: 80%
 1001st km – 1500th km section: 70%
 1501st km – 2500th km section: 60%
 2501st km and above section: 50%

 Ticketing system development extra charge

For ticket price less than or equal to ¥5.00, ¥1.00 is added, or ¥0.50 is added. For hard-class travels ≥ 200 km, train station air-conditioning fee ¥1.00 is charged.

For example, for the “new-type air-conditioning normal-fast” train 1363 from Beijing West to Zhengzhou (rate-making distance=689 km), so 685 km is used according to the rule above, the upper berth price is calculated as:
 Passenger ticket and insurance:
 First 200 km: ¥0.11722/km * 200 km = ¥23.444
 201st km – 500th km: ¥0.11722/km * 300 km * 90% = ¥31.6494
 501st km – 685th km: ¥0.11722/km * 185 km * 80% = ¥17.34856
 Insurance: ceil_¥0.10(¥23.444+¥31.6494+¥17.34856)*1%)=¥0.80
 Total passenger ticket price: round(¥23.444+¥31.6494+¥17.34856+¥0.80)=¥73
 Speed up ticket:
 First 200 km: ¥0.011722/km * 200 km = ¥2.3444
 201st km – 500th km: ¥0.011722/km * 300 km * 90% = ¥3.16494
 501st km – 685th km: ¥0.011722/km * 185 km * 80% = ¥1.734856
 Total speed up ticket price: round(¥2.3444+¥3.16494+¥1.734856)=¥7
 Air-conditioning ticket:
 First 200 km: ¥0.0146525/km * 200 km = ¥2.9305
 201st km – 500th km: ¥0.0146525/km * 300 km * 90% = ¥3.956175
 501st km – 685th km: ¥0.0146525/km * 185 km * 80% = ¥2.16857
 Total air-conditioning ticket price: round(¥2.9305+¥3.956175+¥2.16857)=¥9
 Sleeper ticket:
 First 200 km: ¥0.1025675/km * 200 km = ¥20.5135
 201st km – 500th km: ¥0.1025675/km * 300 km * 90% = ¥27.693225
 501st km – 685th km: ¥0.1025675/km * 185 km * 80% = ¥15.17999
 Total air-conditioning ticket price: round(¥20.5135+¥27.693225 +¥15.17999)+¥10=¥73
 Ticketing system development extra charge: ¥1
 Total price: round(¥73*150%)+round(¥7*150%)+round(¥9*150%)+(round((¥73-¥10)*150%)+¥10)+¥1=¥241

References 

Passenger rail transport in China